Elisabeth Antoinette Irwin (29 August 1880, Brooklyn, New York–16 October 1942, Manhattan, age 62) was the founder of the Little Red School House.  She was an educator, psychologist, reformer, and declared lesbian, living with her life partner Katharine Anthony and the two children they adopted.

Life and career

Irwin was born in Brooklyn, to William Henry Irwin and Josephina Augusta Easton.  Her father was a cotton merchant.  She attended the Packer Collegiate Institute and received her A.B. from Smith College in 1903, and her M.A. from Columbia University in 1923. She was a member of the feminist intellectual club Heterodoxy.

In 1912 while a member of the staff of the Public Education Association, she began work at revising the curriculum for the children at Public School 64.  She founded the Little Red School House curriculum, in Manhattan in 1921, in the red-painted annex of Public School 61.  Her work there, and then at Public School 41, is described in an article for The New York Times as an experiment to demonstrate that "...the broader, more active program of the so-called progressive schools could be carried out under public school conditions."

Faced with funding cuts, it appeared the experiment would end, but a group of parents came together in an ice cream parlor, urging her to start her own school and promising financial support.  In September 1932 the "Little Red School House" got its own building at Bleecker Street.  At first only primary education was available, but in 1940 a high school was added.

She died in the New York Hospital in October 1942.  She was survived by her partner, Katharine Anthony, and their two adopted daughters, Mrs Howard Gresens of Plandome, New York and Mrs R.O. Bogue of Pensacola, Florida. Her funeral was conducted in Gaylordsville, Connecticut where she and Miss Anthony maintained a summer home, having called themselves the "gay ladies of Gaylordsville".  She was buried there alongside Miss Anthony.

References

1880 births
1942 deaths
Lesbians
LGBT people from New York (state)
Smith College alumni
People from Brooklyn
20th-century American educators
American educational theorists
Columbia University alumni
Educators from New York City
20th-century American women educators
LGBT psychologists